Akbar Khan is a village which is part of Pantalavdi, Gujarat.

History
The petty (e)state, in the Pandu Mehwas division of Rewa Kantha, comprising the town and two more villages, covered 2 1/2 square miles and was ruled by Muslim Chieftains. It has a combined population of 178 in 1901, yielding a state revenue of 2,544 Rupees (1903-4, nearly all from land), paying a tribute of 127 Rupees to Rajpipla State.

External links
 Imperial Gazetteer, on DSAL - Kathiawar

Princely states of Gujarat
Muslim princely states of India